Mate preferences in humans refers to why one human chooses or chooses not to mate with another human and their reasoning why (see: Evolutionary Psychology, mating).  Men and women have been observed having different criteria as what makes a good or ideal mate (gender differences).  A potential mate's socioeconomic status has also been seen as having a noticeable effect, especially in developing areas where social status is more emphasized.

Female mate preferences

In humans, when choosing a mate of the opposite sex, females place high preference for a mate that is physically attractive. This ties in with the idea that women discriminate between men on hypothesized fitness cues. The more physically attractive a man is, the higher his fitness, and the better his genes will be.  Women are attracted to masculine traits greater in sexual dimorphism (e.g. strong jawline, a more muscular body, a taller height). Indeed, men who are more masculine tend to have a higher number of sexual partners.

Male physical attractiveness

The Immunocompetence Handicap Hypothesis 

This hypothesis suggests that secondary sexual characteristics such as a low waist-to-chest ratio or masculine facial features (e.g. strong jawline, larger brow ridge, more muscular) are reliable indicators of mate quality as the hormones that cause their development (i.e. testosterone) suppress the immune system of an individual. With immunosuppression a male would be more susceptible to diseases or pathogens. However if a male is in good enough condition to weather these negative effects, it would be indicative to women, who selected these men as mates, that they have good genes.

Waist-to-chest ratio 
Like men, who have a preference for a lower waist-to-hip ratio (WHR), a measure linked to female bodily attractiveness, women tend to be more attracted to men who have broader shoulders and relatively narrow waists (the waist-to-chest ratio; WCR). The ratio, changed by the distribution of android fat in the torso, makes the characteristic V-shape and is related to levels of testosterone in males, also correlated with higher perceived dominance of males.

Cross-culturally however the waist-to-chest ratio significance differs. A cross-cultural study across urban and rural settings in Britain and Malaysia found that BMI and waist-to-hip ratio also play roles in rating male physical attractiveness. In urban settings, participants would place a larger importance on WCR, minor importance on BMI and no significant importance on WHR. In rural settings BMI was however found to be the most important factor in deciding physical attractiveness.

Fluctuating Asymmetry

Fluctuating Asymmetry (FA) is the deviation from perfect bilateral symmetry in an organism. The more symmetrical an organism is, the better they are at handling developmental stress arising from environmental stress, genetic problems and developmental instability. Along with developmental stability, FA indicates the genetic fitness of an individual and will therefore affect sexual selection. Men with high facial symmetry are rated as more attractive, dominant, sexy, and healthy than their counterparts. Low FA males report more sexual partners across a lifetime, an earlier age of first sexual intercourse, and have more offspring than high FA men. Additionally, low FA men's partners report more orgasms than those whose partners have high FA. With other results showing that women find low FA men's voice  and scent more attractive, it is clear that mating preference is affected by FA.

Resources 
Males with the ability and willingness to provide resources are highly desirable to females. In our evolutionary past, this would have been demonstrated through the ability to provide food, shelter, and protection. In modern day humans, cues to high resource acquisition are presented in different ways. Cross-culturally, females show an increased preference for economic resources than do males, and those males who marry at a certain age tend to earn significantly more than males of the same age who do not marry. As females often choose mates young, the amount of resources that they actually possess may be small. Therefore, females seek traits indicative of potential resource acquisition ability such as a good education, ambition, and career potential. If a male becomes unemployed or lazy, the female is far more likely to discontinue the relationship with them. In fact, even clothing can act as a cue for sexual selection, with females being more willing to engage in relationships with men wearing high status clothing.

Age 
Age is another trait which is sexually selected by females. Studies have consistently found that females tend to select mates that are roughly 4 years older than themselves, and this even applies cross-culturally. Older men are much more likely to be financially secure and further along in their career, thus able to provide greater economic resources to the female and any future offspring.

Male mate preferences 
It is a well-known fact that men assign as far greater salience to the attractiveness of a potential mate when considering their mating preference than women do.

Body shape and size 
The first factor that has been shown to impact mating preference in males is that of Waist Hip Ratio (WHR), that is the relationship between waist circumference and hip circumference, as it has been suggested as a marker of age, reproductive status and health. It was also found that women with a WHR of 0.7 were rated the most attractive, youthful, fertile and healthy, when compared to other WHR's. Furthermore, the current research also found that those women with a WHR of 0.7 and of normal weight were rated the most attractive, and whereas those with a WHR of 0.7 but whom were underweight were rated as more youthful but not as attractive. An extension of WHR research  showed that there is an impact of breast and hip size upon attractiveness; Women with large breasts, and small hips were rated more attractive than women with small breasts and small hips, as well as finding that women with large hips were rated less attractive irrespective of breast size.

Skin condition 
Skin condition has been found to be an honest indicator of sex hormones which may indicate levels of fertility. The study directly examines the relationship between an individual having acne and the levels of hormones that could potentially indicate low fertility, therefore guiding attractiveness for mate preference. This skin condition, attractiveness  link has been corroborated by research that  found that skin colour, skin homogeneity and facial adiposity (how fat is deposited around the face) all predict female attractiveness and therefore, mate preference. Skin tone has also been found to be an honest indicator of youthfulness and fertility; as well as research showing  the first links between  estradiol and female facial redness, in which as a woman reaches the peak of her ovulatory cycle her facial redness increases. This research would suggest that male mate preference would be guided by the individuals skin tone, looking for women with redder facial skin tones they indicate peak fertility and optimal opportunity for reproductive success.

Neoteny 
Males show a preference for neotenous or youthful looking features in women, such as; big eyes, a small nose, and full lips. These features act as a signal of fertility as they are caused by high estrogen and low testosterone. As a result of evolution, these features are deemed as highly attractive as they would indicate a higher chance of successful reproduction. This male mate preference for neoteny has been shown in research  in which men were asked to morph images of female faces until an ideal face was achieved.

Chastity 
Chastity is deemed highly desirable across cultures however the extent of its importance shows some variation. The importance of chastity to males, in an evolutionary sense has been linked to paternal certainty; as before contraception, the only way to ensure a woman had not been inseminated by another man was if she were chaste.

Parental investment 
The idea of parental investment is common both in humans and in the animal kingdom and derives from the fact that across most species there is an imbalance in the amount of time each parent invests in their offspring. Parental investment acts as a determinant of offspring survival, and accessing this investment is important for the sex that doesn’t provide as much PI. This theory states that the sex that invests the most time in raising its offspring is the limiting sex: it is more selective when choosing a mate. The other sex thus invests most of their time in competing for and courting mates. Sexual selection by the limiting sex is stronger the larger the disparity between PI between the sexes. Parental investment is relatively equal in humans, meaning that selectiveness is similar. Male investment means that males are also selective, and thus, female ornaments have evolved to address this. Parental investment does not explain the interest in the ability to provide resources since the parental investment in long-term mating is similar and, therefore, the selectiveness is too. But females use signs of male parental investment to assess whether men are willing to invest in children.

Gender differences
Mating preferences are not only confined to long-term relationships. Men and women have developed separate sexual strategies that are used for both short-term and long-term mate gain. Psychological adaptations such as mate guarding and sexual jealousy, and biological adaptations such as men’s testes size indicate that polygamy was present in evolutionary history, and is preferred in certain situations. Short term mating forms a larger part of the male sexual strategy, largely due to PI, with men more willing to engage in intercourse sooner and preferring a larger number of partners than women. However, feminist anthropological research has shown that the higher parental investment by females cannot consistently explain a unidirectional gender difference of males being more willing to pursue sexual intercourse with multiple mates; the research of Sarah Hrdy has shown that female apes seek out sexual relations with many mates to accumulate more resources from those male mates who will invest resources given that the female ape's offspring may be any one of the male ape's offspring  Thus, if there are opposing trends in gender differences of mating strategies across various species despite similar gender differences in parental investment across species, gender differences in mating preferences in humans (such as the tendency for male humans to be more willing to engage in intercourse sooner and with more partners) cannot be attributed solely to universal, inherent, dispositional differences between males and females on the basis of the evolutionary perspective; social factors, such as social structures effecting differential power and status between men and women, must also be taken into account. For instance, in more egalitarian cultures, there is less of an age difference between men and women in relationships, indicating the role of social power and status differences in influencing gender differences in age preference (men preferring younger mates, and women preferring older mates).  Mate preference changes depending on the strategy being used: when searching for a long-term mate, women often tend to emphasise resources, but in the short term, a potential mate's physical attractiveness is weighed more heavily because it is a good indicator of desirable genes.

Predictors for long-term relationship success
In a study conducted by Shackleford, Schmitt, & Buss (2005), four dimensions were found that seem to predict how compatible two people are in what they're looking for in a long-term relationship.  The survey was given to over 9,800 people from 37 different cultures across 6 continents and 5 islands. The four dimensions are:

Love vs. Status/Resources—trade-off between a loving relationship and a partner with adequate resources and status
Dependable/Stable vs. Good Looks/Health—trade-off between choosing an emotionally stable partner and one that is physically attractive
Education/Intelligence vs. Desire for Home/Children—trade-off between educational factors and a range of family matters like wanting of kids and chastity
Sociability vs. Similar Religion—tradeoff between a partner who is sociable and a partner that is religiously similar or compatible.

The four dimensions found imply individuals considering a relationship weigh the importance of the two sides of each dimension for a long term relationship.  For example, the higher a person scores on the Love vs. Status/Resources scale, the more that person is extroverted and the more emphasis they place on Love.  A person scoring lower would be an introvert and place more emphasis on Status/Resources.  Analogous reasoning applies to the other three dimensions, too, the first named concept being the higher valued end of the continuum and the second-named being the lower end.  Negative scores indicate direction but not value of the concept.

There were several gender differences observed in the study.  For instance, men seemed to rate Love vs Status/Resources higher in importance in relation to women, meaning men place more of an emphasis on mutual love while women place more of an emphasis on Status/Resources. Women rated the other three dimensions higher in importance.  A majority of cases saw women rate Dependable/Stable vs. Good Looks/Health higher, implying a stable personality is more desirable to women than a physically attractive mate. Education/Intelligence vs. Desire for Home/Children was also rated higher, showing that similar educational background and political views are more important than home life, and a small number of cases had women rank Sociability vs. Similar Religion higher (a pleasing disposition is more important than sharing religious beliefs).

In sum, men appear to value physical attractiveness, health, and a want for home life and children in their long-term mates, whereas women appear to value maturity, dependability, education, social status, and financial stability.

Mate preference priorities
Research has attempted to assess which mate preferences men and women prioritize when selecting mates. Such studies typically involve an element of forced choice, such as asking participants to "design" their ideal partner using a fixed budget. When budgets are small, participants tend to prioritise those characteristics historically necessary for successful reproduction and relationship functioning - including physical attractiveness, social status, and kindness. One cross-cultural study found similar prioritisation patterns in both Eastern (e.g., Malaysia, Singapore) and Western (e.g., the United Kingdom, Australia, Norway) cultures.

References

Interpersonal relationships
Evolutionary psychology